NGC 99 is a spiral galaxy in the constellation Pisces. It was discovered on 8 October 1883 by the French astronomer Édouard Stephan.

References

External links 
 

Spiral galaxies
Pisces (constellation)
Astronomical objects discovered in 1883
0099
0230
01523
Discoveries by Édouard Stephan